Andrew Charles Marshall (born 24 August 1973) is an English professional golfer.

Marshall was born in Sutton-in-Ashfield and turned professional in 1995. In 2001, he finished 4th on the Challenge Tour Rankings to earn his card on the top level European Tour. In late 2001, in one of his first tournaments as a full member of the European Tour he finished 6th at the Omega Hong Kong Open. However, he failed to build on that start and had to regain his card via qualifying school at the end of the 2002.

Marshall maintained his playing status through the end of the 2007 season, with a best end of season ranking of 73rd on the Order of Merit in 2006, and best tournament results of runner-up at the 2003 Madeira Island Open and the 2006 Johnnie Walker Championship at Gleneagles. In 2007, he slipped down the rankings and had to drop down to the Challenge Tour for 2008.

Professional wins (5)

PGA EuroPro Tour wins (2)

MENA Tour wins (2)

Other wins (1)
2021 Farmfoods British Par 3 Championship

Results in major championships

Note: Marshall only played in The Open Championship.
CUT = missed the half-way cut
"T" = tied

See also
2011 European Tour Qualifying School graduates

External links

English male golfers
European Tour golfers
Sportspeople from Sutton-in-Ashfield
People from Dereham
1973 births
Living people